The Council of Cardinals (also called C9 due to the fact it contained 9 cardinal members for some time), also known as the Council of Cardinal Advisers, is a group of cardinals of the Catholic Church appointed by Pope Francis to serve as his advisers. The Council was formally established on 28 September 2013.

Abbreviations 
The Council of Cardinals was named under abbreviations referring to the number of cardinals advisers which, over time, it comprised: C8 (8 cardinals), C9 (9 cardinals), C6 (6 cardinals), C7 (7 cardinals).

History 
The appointment of a group of 8 advisors and one secretary to support the pope and the reform of the Roman Curia was announced on 13 April 2013, one month after his election. The same group was formally established as the Council of Cardinals on 28 September of the same year by a chirograph of Pope Francis.

Secretary of State Pietro Parolin was added as member of the Council in July 2014. The Holy See used the expression "Council of the nine" (Consiglio dei nove in Italian) in September 2014.

In 2018 Marco Mellino was named as adjunct secretary of the Council's secretary Marcello Semeraro. Pope Francis later removed three of the Council's 9 members in late 2018.

Francis appointed another cardinal as member in 2020, and also replaced secretary Marcello Semeraro by Marco Mellino.

In March 2023, three cardinal advisors were removed, and five new cardinal advisors were appointed; the three other cardinals and the secretary were kept (re-appointed). This made the current total of 9 cardinal advisers and one secretary.

Purpose 
On 13 April 2013, the Holy See stated the cardinals had been appointed "to advise [the Pope] in the government of the universal Church and to study a plan for revising the Apostolic Constitution on the Roman Curia, 'Pastor Bonus. In the 28 September 2013 chirograph, Pope Francis stated the Council had the goal "of assisting me in the governance of the universal Church and of studying a project for the revision of the Apostolic Constitution Pastor Bonus on the Roman Curia", and that "said Council will be a further expression of episcopal communion and assistance to the munus petrinum which the Episcopate across the world is able to offer".

The Council of Cardinals was thus created primarily to assist Pope Francis in the reform of the Roman Curia. Said reform was promulgated in 2022 through the apostolic constitution Praedicate evangelium. The Council continues to exist and to perform verious activities, despite having achieved its main goal.

Due to the advisory role of the body, some publications have likened it to a privy council.

Leadership and membership
The council currently comprises 9 cardinals, assisted by Bishop Marco Mellino as its secretary:
  Pietro Parolin, Cardinal Secretary of State (since 2014)
  Fernando Vérgez Alzaga, President of the Governorate of the Vatican City State and President of the Pontifical Commission for the Vatican City State (since 2023)
  Fridolin Ambongo Besungu , Archbishop of Kinshasa (since 2020)
  Oswald Gracias, Archbishop of Bombay (since 2013)
  Seán Patrick O'Malley , Archbishop of Boston and President of the Pontifical Commission for the Protection of Minors (since 2013) 
 Juan José Omella Omella, Archbishop of Barcelona (since 2023)
 Gérald Lacroix, Archbishop of Quebec (since 2023)
 Jean-Claude Hollerich, Archbishop of Luxembourg (since 2023)
 Sérgio da Rocha, Archbishop of São Salvador da Bahia (since 2023)

At the time of its formation, the council had eight members. Cardinal Parolin was not among the council's original membership, but attended the meetings regularly and, in July 2014, was confirmed by the Holy See Press Office as a ninth member of the council.

Former members 
 2013–2018: Francisco Javier Errázuriz Ossa
 2013–2018: Laurent Monsengwo Pasinya
 2013–2018: George Pell
 2013–2023: Reinhard Marx
 2013–2023: Óscar Andrés Rodríguez Maradiaga  (former coordinator)
 2013–2023: Giuseppe Bertello

Former secretaries 

 2013–2020: Marcello Semeraro

Former adjunct secretaries 

 2018–2020: Marco Mellino (stopped being adjunct secretaries to become secretary)

References

Further reading

External links 

 Communiqué on the first nomination of the cardinal advisers
 Chirograph establishing the Council of Cardinals

Christian organizations established in 2013
2013 establishments in Vatican City

Reforms of the Roman Curia
Pope Francis
 
Advisory councils for heads of state